Vera is an unincorporated community in Sharon Township, Fayette County, Illinois, United States.

History
Vera originally was called Bear Creek. The present name, derived from the Spanish or Latin means "true".

Geography

References

Unincorporated communities in Illinois
Unincorporated communities in Fayette County, Illinois